Bear Mountain may refer to:

Mountains

 Bear Mountain (Seward, Alaska), in the Kenai Mountains
 Bear Mountain (Kern County, California), located in the Tehachapi Mountains
 Bear Mountain (Santa Clara County, California), located in the Diablo Range
 Bear Mountain (Siskiyou County, California), located in the Siskiyou Mountains
 Bear Mountain (Connecticut), located in the southern Taconic Mountains
 Bear Mountain (Georgia), located in the Appalachian Mountains
 Bear Mountain (Glacier County, Montana), located in the northern Lewis Range
 Bear Mountain (New Hampshire), located in the White Mountains
 Bear Mountain (Hudson Highlands), in New York State
 Bear Mountain (Carbon County, Pennsylvania), located in the Lehigh Valley
 Bear Mountain (South Dakota), located in the Black Hills

Other uses
 Bear Mountain (resort), a golf resort community in Greater Victoria, British Columbia, Canada
 Bear Mountain (ski area), a ski resort in southern California
 Bear Mountain, West Virginia, unincorporated community in Barbour County
 Bear Mountain (band), Canadian indie band

See also
 Bare Mountain (disambiguation)
 Bear Mountains, in New Mexico
 Bear Mountain Ski Hill, near Dawson Creek, British Columbia
 Bear Mountain State Park, containing the New York mountain
 Bear Mountain Bridge, in New York State
 Bear Mountain Inn, in New York State